WPFT is a classic hits radio station licensed to Pigeon Forge, Tennessee. Owned by East Tennessee Radio Group, L.P., WPFT serves the Knoxville, Tennessee area.

History
"106.3 the Mountain" dropped classic hits late in 2009 for sports talk. On September 29, 2014, the station dropped ESPN Radio for a locally programmed country music format, with an emphasis on music from the 1970s through the 2000s and local news.

In January 2018, they added long-time East Tennessee radio personality, Mike Howard to the line-up with the "Mike in the Morning" radio show. The station has since moved from country to a classic hits format.

Previous logo

References

External links
Mountain Country 106.3 Website

PFT